The RBC Convention Centre Winnipeg (formerly the Winnipeg Convention Centre) is a major meeting and convention centre located in downtown Winnipeg, Manitoba, Canada.

It has five levels including indoor parking for 729 vehicles, and three levels of various meeting trade show space totalling . The main exhibit hall has  of pillar-less space.

The convention centre is connected to the Winnipeg Walkway system via an above-ground walkway connection crossing St. Mary Avenue and Hargrave Street to Cityplace mall. The Walkway system also provides convenient access to the Canada Life Centre, the city's 15,300-seat indoor arena which is home to the Winnipeg Jets.

History
The convention centre was recommended as part of the Metropolitan Corporation of Greater Winnipeg (Metro) Downtown Development Plan of 1969.

Metro and the Province of Manitoba announced the $35-million Winnipeg Convention Centre on 10 September 1970. Always in opposition to metropolitan government, Mayor of Winnipeg Stephen Juba did not attend the announcing press conference.

Originally named the Winnipeg Convention Centre, the publicly-owned facility was built and opened in 1975. The building, designed by Canadian architect Isadore (Issie) Coop, of the Number Ten Architectural Group, was among the first "purpose-built" convention centre of its kind built in Canada.

Aside from trade shows and conventions, the Convention Centre has also been used as a sports venue and was home to the Winnipeg Cyclone basketball team from 1995 to 2001.

A $180-million expansion, completed between 2012 and 2015, roughly doubled the size of the facility, adding  of exhibit space and underground parking.  In July 2013, the facility was rebranded as the RBC Convention Centre Winnipeg after its naming rights were purchased by Royal Bank of Canada. By 2017 the annual visitor count to the Winnipeg Convention Centre had increased by about 50,000 to 557,000 which was directly related to the WCC expansion.

Beginning in January 2021, the facility began operating as a "super site" for COVID-19 vaccinations.

Events 

The Winnipeg Convention Centre hosts regularly scheduled annual events such as a New Years' Eve dinner and dance, a Christmas crafts show known as the "Signatures Handmade Market", the Mid-Canada Boat Show, the Manitoba RV Show and Sale, the Winnipeg Career Fair, the Home & Garden Show (formerly Home Expression Show), the Winnipeg Comicon Show, a Wedding Show.

In the 1970s it was the host venue for the Progressive Conservative (1976) and the Liberal (June 1984?) leadership conventions. The WCC was the site of the January 1983 PC party convention where Joe Clark decided to step down as leader.

All provincial leadership conventions, except recent NDP, since 1975 have been held at the Winnipeg Convention Centre.

References

External links

 RBC Convention Centre Winnipeg website

Buildings and structures in downtown Winnipeg
Convention centres in Canada
Basketball venues in Canada
Handball venues in Canada
Sports venues in Winnipeg
Venues of the 1999 Pan American Games
Pan American Games handball venues